Salesville is a city in Baxter County, Arkansas, United States. The population was 450 in 2010.

Geography
Salesville is located in central Baxter County at  (36.244845, -92.275619). The North Fork River, after coming out of the dam, forms the eastern boundary of Salesville.

List of highways
 Arkansas Highway 5
 Arkansas Highway 177

Education 
Salesville is in the Norfork School District with students graduating from Norfork High School.

Demographics

As of the census of 2000, there were 437 people, 206 households, and 131 families residing in the city. The racial makeup of the city was 95.42% White, 1.37% Native American, 0.23% Asian, 0.69% from other races, and 2.29% from two or more races.  1.60% of the population were Hispanic or Latino of any race.

There were 206 households, out of which 20.9% had children under the age of 18 living with them, 56.3% were married couples living together, 5.8% had a female householder with no husband present, and 36.4% were non-families. 33.5% of all households were made up of individuals, and 17.0% had someone living alone who was 65 years of age or older.  The average household size was 2.12 and the average family size was 2.72.

In the city, the population was spread out, with 17.8% under the age of 18, 4.3% from 18 to 24, 23.6% from 25 to 44, 31.1% from 45 to 64, and 23.1% who were 65 years of age or older.  The median age was 48 years. For every 100 females, there were 94.2 males.  For every 100 females age 18 and over, there were 87.0 males.

The median income for a household in the city was $23,542, and the median income for a family was $33,611. Males had a median income of $29,531 versus $17,250 for females. The per capita income for the city was $17,077.  About 9.8% of families and 12.9% of the population were below the poverty line, including 13.3% of those under age 18 and 13.8% of those age 65 or over.

External links
 Map of Salesville (US Census Bureau)
 Map of Baxter County (US Census Bureau)
 Norfork School District
 Baxter County Historical and Genealogical Society

References

Cities in Baxter County, Arkansas
Cities in Arkansas